Pottawatomie Township may refer to the following townships in the United States:

 Pottawatomie Township, Coffey County, Kansas
 Pottawatomie Township, Franklin County, Kansas